2 is the second full-length album by the Austrian singer-songwriter Luise Gruber, better known as Saint Lu. The album is noteworthy for its music direction change, from the blues and rock of its predecessor toward a more soul-oriented aesthetic with elements of funk, jazz and baroque pop. The album was released on 15 February 2013 via Warner Music. The album was intended to accompany Saint Lu's representation of Germany at the Eurovision Song Contest in Malmö but the selection jury in Hannover selected Cascada instead.

Track listing

An acoustic EP, named "2 (Acoustic EP)" was released shortly after the release of the album. It contains new, acoustic arrangements of six of the songs from the album

Personnel

 Patrik Majer – producer, engineer, percussion
 Sven Teichmann – engineer
 Steve Price – engineer
 Saint Lu – co-producer, glockenspiel
 Ben Hamilton – acoustic guitar
 Alex Grube – bass
 Philipp Schwär – co-producer
 Jan Burkamp – drums
 James Bryan – electric guitar
 Jimmy Messer – electric guitar
 Lars Cölln – electric guitar
 Christian Löhr – keyboards
 Philipp Schwär – keyboards, programming
 Philipp Steinke – keyboards
 Tim Baxter – keyboards
 Sebastian Borowski – saxophone
 Steve Sidwell – strings
 Christoph Titz – trumpet

Critical reception
Oberösterreichische Nachrichten, Austria, describes the album as "abounding with emotions and ideas. Soul Pop and Blues combine with the dark, versatile grater-like voice of the 30-year old into a fascinating fusion".

Tracks Magazin, Switzerland, writes: "2 keeps what the self-titled debut from 2009 brought into view. At that time, she sang confident pop rock. Now it is more confident and more rock pop with a lot of soul in it".

Steve Braun of Rock Times writes: "2 offers magical moments that reveal Luise Gruber's huge potential. 'Falling For Your Love' must be mentioned first".

Charts

References

2013 albums